KMAR-FM (95.9 “The Bird” FM, "Real Country") is an American radio station licensed to serve the community of Winnsboro, Louisiana. The station airs the syndicated Westwood One programming Real Country in addition to locally produced programming.

The station is owned by John and Nancy Moroni, through licensee Bird Broadcasting Network, LLC.

KMAR has been the home for CodyMac in the Morning since 2014. And the exclusive home for Franklin Parish athletics.

Prior to 2013, the agricultural journalist Regnal Wallace, a native of Franklin Parish, broadcast "Round Franklin", which was carried across northeast Louisiana for sixteen years.

References

External links
 

Radio stations in Louisiana
Country radio stations in the United States